The Franche-Comté regional election, 2010 took place in March 2010.

General Election

First round

Withdraw 

 Jacques Mérédic-Chevrot (New Centre).
 Jean-Philippe Allenbach (Mouvement Franche-Comté), Perennial candidate.
 Jean-François Humbert (DVD), Former President of Franche-Comté and current French Senator.

Primary elections

Socialist Party Primary

Union for a Popular Movement Primary

References

External links

Politics of Franche-Comté
 
2010 elections in France